The 1939 NAIA basketball tournament was held in March at Municipal Auditorium in Kansas City, Missouri. The 3rd annual NAIA basketball tournament featured 32 teams playing in a single-elimination format. This was also the year the NCAA basketball tournament was started.

This tournament also featured the lowest-scoring game in tournament history between Loras College (Iowa) and Central Missouri State University, the two-time champions. Loras scored a total of 16 points, a tournament low as well, Central Missouri State won the game with a total score of 20. The total combined score of the game was 36, resulting in the all-time lowest scoring game in tournament history. 

The championship game featured Southwestern (KS) defeat San Diego State by a score of 32-31. It would be the closest final score until the 1981 tournament which ended in overtime with a score of 86-85. (1939, 1981, and 2016 are the only three years a team has won by one point, to date.)

This year the NAIA awarded the first Chuck Taylor Most Valuable Player Award. The first award went to Edgar Hinshaw of Southwestern College

Awards and honors
Many of the records set by the 1939 tournament have been broken, and many of the awards were established much later:
Leading scorer est. 1963
Leading rebounder est. 1963
Charles Stevenson Hustle Award est. 1958
Coach of the Year est. 1954
Player of the Year est. 1994
Fewest points by team; single game: 16, Loras (Iowa) vs. Central Missouri State 20.
Fewest points in a tournament Game; both teams: 36 total; Central Missouri State vs. Loras (Iowa) (20-16).

Bracket

  * denotes overtime.

See also
 1939 National Invitation Tournament

References

NAIA Men's Basketball Championship
Tournament
NAIA Men’s Division I basketball tournament